Hamidabad (also Romanized as Ḩamīdābād) is a village in Qasemabad Rural District, in the Central District of Rafsanjan County, Kerman Province, Iran. At the 2006 census, its population was 2,087, in 528 families.

References 

Populated places in Rafsanjan County